New Haven is a home rule-class city in Nelson County, Kentucky, United States. The population was 855 at the 2010 census.

Geography
New Haven is located adjacent to the Nelson-Larue county line at the intersection of US Route 31E and Kentucky Route 52. Rolling Fork flows past the west side of the community. Bardstown is approximately 12 miles to the northeast on route 31E.

Demographics

As of the census of 2000, there were 849 people, 341 households, and 243 families residing in the city. The racial makeup of the city was 97.53% White, 1.06% African American, 0.24% Asian, 0.47% from other races, and 0.71% from two or more races. Hispanic or Latino of any race were 1.18% of the population.

There were 341 households, out of which 34.9% had children under the age of 18 living with them, 46.0% were married couples living together, 20.5% had a female householder with no husband present, and 28.7% were non-families. 26.1% of all households were made up of individuals, and 12.6% had someone living alone who was 65 years of age or older. The average household size was 2.49 and the average family size was 2.95.

In the city the population was spread out, with 27.1% under the age of 18, 8.7% from 18 to 24, 29.1% from 25 to 44, 19.3% from 45 to 64, and 15.8% who were 65 years of age or older. The median age was 35 years. For every 100 females, there were 92.5 males. For every 100 females age 18 and over, there were 82.6 males.

The median income for a household in the city was $29,886, and the median income for a family was $37,875. Males had a median income of $28,456 versus $20,809 for females. The per capita income for the city was $15,284. About 17.2% of families and 18.7% of the population were below the poverty line, including 25.7% of those under age 18 and 8.7% of those age 65 or over.

Education
New Haven has a lending library, a branch of the Nelson County Public Library.

Arts and culture
 The Abbey of Our Lady of Gethsemani - Home of the monk Thomas Merton
 Kentucky Railway Museum - Houses "Old 152", the official steam locomotive of Kentucky

References

External links

 Kentucky atlas and gazetteer

Cities in Nelson County, Kentucky
Louisville metropolitan area
1839 establishments in Kentucky
Cities in Kentucky